Mardy Fish and Sam Querrey were the defending champions, but Fish chose not to compete.Querrey decided to play with Juan Martín del Potro, but lost in the quarterfinals to Mark Knowles and Michal Mertiňák.Scott Lipsky and Rajeev Ram won in the final, 6–4, 4–6, [10–8], against Alejandro Falla and Xavier Malisse.

Seeds

Draw

Draw

External links
 Main draw

SAP - Doubles
2011 SAP Open